Streptomyces albogriseolus is a bacterium species from the genus  of Streptomyces which has been isolated from soil. Streptomyces albogriseolus produces neomycin B and neomycin C.

See also 
 List of Streptomyces species

References

Further reading

External links
Type strain of Streptomyces albogriseolus at BacDive -  the Bacterial Diversity Metadatabase

albogriseolus
Bacteria described in 1954